The 1999 UCI Cyclo-cross World Championships were held in Poprad, Slovakia on Saturday 30 January 1999 and Sunday 31 January 1999.

Men's Elite

Held on Sunday January 31, 1999.

Men's Under 23

Held on Saturday January 30, 1999.

Men's Juniors

Held on Sunday January 31, 1999.

Notes

UCI Cyclo-cross World Championships
World Championships
C
C
UCI Cyclo-cross World Championships